Laval Cathedral (French: Cathédrale de la Sainte-Trinité de Laval) is a Roman Catholic church and a national monument in Laval, France. The cathedral has been listed since 1840 as a monument historique by the French Ministry of Culture. Since the establishment of the Diocese of Laval in 1855, it has been its cathedral. The building dates back to the 11th century, but has been much altered and expanded in the 12th, 15th, 16th and 19th centuries.

References

External links

Location

Roman Catholic cathedrals in France
Churches in Mayenne
Monuments historiques of Pays de la Loire